Hukou is a system of household registration used in mainland China. It may also refer to:

Places
Hukou Waterfall (壶口瀑布), the largest waterfall on the Yellow River, at the border of Shanxi and Shaanxi
Hukou County (湖口县), a county in Jiangxi, China
Hukou, Hunan (湖口), a town in Chaling County, Hunan, China
Hukou, Guangdong (湖口), a town in Nanxiong, Guangdong, China
Hukou, Shanxi (壶口), a town in Ji County, Shanxi, China, on one side of the Waterfall
Hukou Township, Shaanxi (壶口乡), a town in Yichuan County, Shaanxi, China, on the other side of the Waterfall
Hukou, Hsinchu (湖口鄉), a township of Hsinchu County, Taiwan
Hukou station (湖口站), a metro station in Wuhan, China

See also
Penghou, a Chinese tree spirit called Hōkō or Houkou in Japanese